Murad I ((nicknamed Hüdavendigâr, from  – meaning "sovereign" in this context); 29 June 1326 – 15 June 1389) was the Ottoman Sultan from 1362 to 1389. He was the son of Orhan Gazi and Nilüfer Hatun. Murad I came into the throne after his elder brother Süleyman Pasha's death.

Murad I conquered Adrianople, renamed it to Edirne, and in 1363 made it the new capital of the Ottoman Sultanate. Then he further expanded the Ottoman realm in Southern Europe by bringing most of the Balkans under Ottoman rule, and forced the princes of Serbia and Bulgaria as well as the East Roman emperor John V Palaiologos to pay him tribute. Murad I administratively divided his sultanate into the two provinces of Anatolia (Asia Minor) and Rumelia (the Balkans).

Titles
According to the Ottoman sources, Murad I's titles included Bey, Emîr-i a’zam (Great Emir), Ghazi, Hüdavendigâr, Khan, Padishah, Sultânü’s-selâtîn (Sultan of sultans), Melikü’l-mülûk (Malik of maliks), while in Bulgarian and Serbian sources he was referred to as Tsar. In a Genoese document, he was referred to as dominus armiratorum Turchie (Master lord of Turks).

Wars

Murad fought against the powerful beylik of Karaman in Anatolia and against the Serbs, Albanians, Bulgarians and Hungarians in Europe. In particular, a Serb expedition to expel the Turks from Adrianople led by the Serbian brothers King Vukašin and Despot Uglješa, was defeated on September 26, 1371, by Murad's capable second lieutenant Lala Şâhin Paşa, the first governor (beylerbey) of Rumeli. In 1385, Sofia fell to the Ottomans. In 1386 Prince Lazar Hrebeljanović defeated an Ottoman force at the Battle of Pločnik. The Ottoman army suffered heavy casualties, and was unable to capture Niš on the way back.

Battle of Kosovo

In 1389, Murad's army defeated the Serbian Army and its allies under the leadership of Lazar at the Battle of Kosovo.
There are different accounts from different sources about when and how Murad I was assassinated. The contemporary sources mainly noted that the battle took place and that both Prince Lazar and the Sultan lost their lives in the battle. The existing evidence of the additional stories and speculations as to how Murad I died were disseminated and recorded in the 15th century and later, decades after the actual event. One Western source states that during the first hours of the battle, Murad I was assassinated by Serbian nobleman and knight Miloš Obilić by knife. Most Ottoman chroniclers (including Dimitrie Cantemir) state that he was assassinated after the finish of the battle while going around the battlefield. His older son Bayezid, who was in charge of the left wing of the Ottoman forces, took charge after that. His other son, Yakub Bey, who was in charge of the other wing, was called to the Sultan's command center tent by Bayezid, but when Yakub Bey arrived he was strangled, leaving Bayezid as the sole claimant to the throne.

In a letter from the Florentine senate (written by Coluccio Salutati) to the King Tvrtko I of Bosnia, dated 20 October 1389, Murad I's (and Jakub Bey's) killing was described. A party of twelve Balkan lords slashed their way through the Ottoman lines defending Murad I. One of them, allegedly Kopiliqi, had managed to get through to the Sultan's tent and kill him with sword stabs to the throat and belly.

Murad's internal organs were buried in Kosovo field and remain to this day on a corner of the battlefield in a location called Meshed-i Hudavendigar which has gained a religious significance for the local Muslims. It was vandalized between 1999–2006 and was renovated recently. His other remains were carried to Bursa, his Anatolian capital city, and were buried in a tomb at the complex built in his name.

Family
He was the son of Orhan and Nilüfer Hatun, a slave concubine, who was of ethnic Greek descent.

Consorts
Murad I had at least seven consorts:
Gulçicek Hatun. Slave concubine. 
Kera Tamara Hatun. Bulgarian princess, daughter of Tsar Ivan Alexander of Bulgaria. Renowned for her beauty, she was forced to marry Murad when he conquered Bulgaria. 
Paşa Melek Hatun. Daughter of Kızıl Murad Bey.
Fülane Hatun. Daughter of Constantine of Kostendil, she married Murad in 1372. Two of her sisters married two of Murad's sons, Bayezid I and Yakub Çelebi. 
Fülane Hatun. Daughter of Cândâroğlu Süleyman II Paşah and his first wife, married Murad in 1383. 
Maria Hatun. Born Maria Paleologa, she was the daughter of the Byzantine emperor John V and his wife Helena Kantakouzene. She married Murad in 1386, while two of her sisters married Murad's sons Bayezid I and Yakub Çelebi.
Fülane Hatun. Daughter of Ahî Seyyid Sultân, married Murad in 1366.

Sons
Murad I had at least five sons:
Bayezid I (1360 - 1403) - with Gulçiçek Hatun. Ottoman Sultan. 
Yakub Çelebi ( 1362 - 20 June 1389). Drowned on Bayezid's orders. 
Savci Bey ( 1364 - November 1385). Executed by his father after he rebelled against him. He had a son, Murad Bey, who fled to Hungary when his father died.
Ibrahim Bey ( 1365 -  1385). Buried in the Osman I mausoleum. 
Yahşi Bey (? - before 1389).

Daughter
Murad I had at least four daughters:
 Özer Hatun. Married with children. Her grandson Mehmed Bey held a post at court in 1426.
 Mihriali Hatun. She married Saruhânoğlu Hızır Bey before 1389.
 Devlet Sultan Hatun. She married Karamânoglu Turgut Bey, by whom she had a son, Mahmud Bey. 
 Nefise Melek Sultan  Hatun ( 1363 - after 1400). She was married off to Karamânoğlu Alâeddîn Alî Bey in an unsuccessful attempt to stop the war. She had at least three sons by him: Mehmed II Bey (1379 - 1423), Alaeddin II Ali Bey (1381 - 1424) and Oğuz Bey (probably died in infancy). Widowed in 1387, she returned to live in Bursa, but on the death of Bayezid I returned to Karaman, where her son had assumed the throne.

Further reading

 Harris, Jonathan, The End of Byzantium. New Haven and London: Yale University Press, 2010.

Notes and references 

Notes:

References:

External links

1326 births
1389 deaths
14th-century murdered monarchs
14th-century Ottoman sultans
Assassinated people from the Ottoman Empire
Characters in Serbian epic poetry
Filicides
Illiterate monarchs
Monarchs killed in action
People of the Bulgarian–Ottoman wars